Below is a partial list of players in the Boston Red Sox minor league organization. Players individually listed here have not yet played in Major League Baseball (MLB), but have reached an advanced level of achievement or notoriety (most minor league players do not meet these criteria). Some notable players in the minor leagues may have their own profile pages, such as first-round draft picks. Note that anyone with a past MLB appearance has their own profile page, even if they are currently playing in the minor leagues.

Wilyer Abreu

Wilyer David Abreu (born June 24, 1999) is a Venezuelan professional baseball outfielder in the Boston Red Sox organization.

Abreu signed with the Houston Astros as an insertional free agent in July 2017. He made that debut that year with the Dominican Summer League Astros. On August 1, 2022 the Astros traded Abreu and Enmanuel Valdez to the Boston Red Sox for Christian Vázquez.

The Red Sox added Abreu to their 40-man roster after the 2022 season. On March 5, 2023, while running out a base hit against the Miami Marlins in a spring training game, Abreu suffered a left hamstring strain. Manager Alex Cora noted that he “will be out for a while.” He was later optioned to the Triple-A Worcester Red Sox on March 11.

Miguel Bleis

Miguel Bleis (born March 1, 2004) is an Dominican professional baseball outfielder in the Boston Red Sox organization.

Bleis was signed by the Boston Red Sox on January 15, 2021, and received a $1.5 million signing bonus. He was assigned to the Dominican Summer League Red Sox to begin his professional career and hit for a .252 average in 36 games. Bleis spent the 2022 season with the Rookie-level Florida Complex League Red Sox and slashed .301/.353/.542 with 14 doubles, four triples, and five home runs while driving in 27 runs, scoring 28 runs, and stealing 18 bases over 40 games. His season ended in August after he experienced back tightness. Bleis entered the 2023 season ranked as a consensus top-100 prospect.

Kole Cottam

Kole Warren Cottam (born May 30, 1997) is an American professional baseball catcher in the Boston Red Sox organization.

Cottam attended Knoxville Catholic High School in Knoxville, Tennessee, where he earned three varsity letters in baseball. During his junior season in 2014, he hit .373 with 25 RBIs. As a senior in 2015, he batted .489 with six home runs, 54 RBIs, and 18 doubles. He went unselected in the 2015 Major League Baseball draft and enrolled at the University of Kentucky where he played college baseball.

As a freshman at Kentucky in 2016, he batted .287 with one home run and 15 RBIs over forty games before hitting .319 with seven home runs and 44 RBIs over 55 games as a sophomore. During the summer of 2017, he played in the Cape Cod Baseball League with the Yarmouth-Dennis Red Sox. As a junior in 2018, he played in 56 games and batted .352 with 19 home runs, 51 RBIs, and 12 doubles. Following the season's end, he was selected by the Boston Red Sox in the fourth round with the 130th overall selection in the 2018 Major League Baseball draft. He signed with the team for $375,000.

Cottam split his first professional season in 2018 between the Lowell Spinners and Greenville Drive, batting .236 with three home runs and 24 RBIs over 32 games. He spent the 2019 season with Greenville and the Salem Red Sox and hit a combined .255 with eight home runs and 44 RBIs over 87 games between the teams. He did not play a game in 2020 due to the COVID-19 pandemic causing the cancellation of the minor league season. He split the 2021 season between Greenville and the Portland Sea Dogs, slashing .278/.371/.500 with ten home runs and 33 RBIs over 71 games. He opened the 2022 season back with Portland and was promoted to the Worcester Red Sox in early August. Over 78 games between the two teams, he batted .255 with two home runs and 28 RBIs.

Kentucky Wildcats bio

Nick Decker

Nicholas Decker (born October 2, 1999) is an American professional baseball outfielder in the Boston Red Sox organization.

Decker attended Seneca High School in New Jersey and was committed to play baseball on scholarship at the University of Maryland. He played in the 2017 Perfect Game All American Classic, where he received a lot of exposure with draft scouts. He was drafted by Boston in the second round (64th pick overall) of the 2018 MLB Draft. Rather than attending Maryland, he chose to sign with the Red Sox for a $1.25 million signing bonus. Decker played briefly with the Gulf Coast League Red Sox during the 2018 season, appearing in two games and going 1-for-4 (.250) at the plate. He began the 2019 season in extended spring training, then joined the Class A Short Season Lowell Spinners at the start of their season. With Lowell, he appeared in 53 games, batting .247 with six home runs and 25 RBIs. After the 2020 minor league season was cancelled due to the COVID-19 pandemic, Decker was invited to participate in the Red Sox' fall instructional league. Decker began the 2021 season in Low-A with the Salem Red Sox. In late June, he was assigned to the Florida Complex League Red Sox where he played five games on a rehabilitation assignment following an injury. Overall during 2021, Decker played 73 games while batting .270 with eight home runs and 40 RBIs.

Decker began the 2022 season in High-A with the Greenville Drive.

Max Ferguson

Max Tucker Ferguson (born August 23, 1999) is an American professional baseball second baseman in the Boston Red Sox organization.

Ferguson played college baseball at Tennessee for three seasons. In 2019, he played collegiate summer baseball with the Falmouth Commodores of the Cape Cod Baseball League. He batted .333 with two home runs, nine stolen bases, and 12 runs scored before his 2020 sophomore season at Tennessee was cut short due to the coronavirus pandemic. As a junior, Ferguson hit .253 with 12 home runs and 15 stolen bases.

Ferguson was selected in the 5th round of the 2021 Major League Baseball draft by the San Diego Padres. After signing with the team he was assigned to the Rookie-level Arizona Complex League Padres before being promoted to the Lake Elsinore Storm of Low-A West and batted .212 with 29 runs scored and 15 stolen bases in 37 games between the two teams. Ferguson returned to Lake Elsinore at the beginning of the 2022 season. He batted .247 and stole 51 bases in 64 games with the team before being promoted to the High-A Fort Wayne TinCaps of the Midwest League.

On August 2, 2022, Ferguson, Eric Hosmer, Corey Rosier, and cash considerations were traded to the Boston Red Sox in exchange for Jay Groome.

Tennessee Volunteers bio

Ryan Fitzgerald

Ryan Fitzgerald (born June 17, 1994) is an American professional baseball utility player in the Boston Red Sox organization.

Fitzgerald grew up in Burr Ridge, Illinois, and attended Fenwick High School. He played college baseball at Creighton Universityfor four seasons. He was named second-team All-Big East Conference as a junior, and had a .230 batting average as a senior.

Fitzgerald went unselected in the 2016 MLB draft. He signed with the Gary SouthShore RailCats of the independent American Association of Professional Baseball in 2017. His contract was purchased by the Boston Red Sox on May 15, 2018. The Red Sox assigned Fitzgerald to the Greenville Drive of the Class A South Atlantic League, where he batted .274 with 44 runs scored and 38 RBIs. He spent the 2019 season with Class A-Advanced Salem Red Sox and hit .271 with 125 hits, 63 runs scored, and 65 RBIs and was named the organization's defensive player of the year. He started the 2021 season with the Double-A Portland Sea Dogs. Fitzgerald was promoted to the Triple-A Worcester Red Sox after batting .271 in 95 games with Portland.

Fitzgerald participated in Boston's 2022 spring training a non-roster invitee. He was assigned to Worcester to start the 2022 season.

Creighton Bluejays bio

Michael Gettys

Michael Edward Gettys (born October 22, 1995) is an American professional baseball pitcher in the Boston Red Sox organization. Before August 2021, Gettys played as an outfielder.

Gettys attended Gainesville High School in Gainesville, Georgia. He was the Gainesville Times Player of the Year in 2012 and 2014. He committed to play college baseball for the Georgia Bulldogs. Gettys was at one point considered a potential first round pick in the 2014 Major League Baseball draft. He was drafted by the San Diego Padres in the second round of the draft. 

Gettys made his professional debut with the Arizona League Padres and spent the whole season there, slashing .310/.353/.437 with three home runs and 38 RBIs in 52 games. He spent 2015 with the Fort Wayne TinCaps and batted .231 with six home runs and 44 RBIs in 122 games. In 2016, he played for both Fort Wayne and the Lake Elsinore Storm, posting a combined .305 batting average with 12 home runs, 60 RBIs, and 33 stolen bases in 128 total games between both clubs. Gettys returned to Lake Elsinore in 2017 where he batted .254 with 17 home runs, 51 RBIs, and 22 stolen bases in 116 games, and led all minor leaguers with 500 or more plate appearances with a strikeout percentage of 37.2%. In 2018, he played for the San Antonio Missions where he hit .230 with 15 home runs, 53 RBIs, and 17 stolen bases in 125 games. He spent 2019 in Triple-A with the El Paso Chihuahuas, slashing .256/.305/.517 with 31 home runs, 91 RBIs, and 14 stolen bases over 128 games.

On November 17, 2020, Gettys signed a minor-league deal with the Boston Red Sox. Gettys began the 2021 season in Triple-A with the Worcester Red Sox, batting .201 in 46 games with five home runs and 14 RBIs. In August 2021, he began playing as a pitcher; in five relief appearances with the Florida Complex League Red Sox, he allowed two runs in five innings (3.60 ERA) while striking out five batters.

Gettys began the 2022 season in High-A with the Greenville Drive.

Devlin Granberg

Devlin Granberg (born September 8, 1995) is an American professional baseball outfielder in the Boston Red Sox organization.

Granberg was born and grew up in Hudson, Colorado and attended Holy Family High School.

Granberg began his college baseball career at Creighton. As a freshman, he hit for a .111 average in 18 at-bats. Granberg transferred to Cisco College after his freshman year. He batted .535 with seven home runs, 25 doubles 57 RBIs and 69 runs scored and was named the North Texas Junior College Athletic Conference Player of the Year as a sophomore. Granberg transferred to Dallas Baptist University for his remaining collegiate eligibility and led the Missouri Valley Conference with .359 batting average in his first season with the team. As a senior, he batted .443 with 13 home runs and 70 RBIs while leading the nation with 112 hits and was named the MVC Player of the Year. Granberg also won the Bobby Bragan Collegiate Slugger Award.

Granberg was selected in the 6th of the 2018 Major League Baseball draft by the Boston Red Sox. He was assigned to the Class A Short Season Lowell Spinners after signing with the team. Granberg began 2019 with the Greenville Drive of the Class A South Atlantic League before being promoted to the Class A-Advanced Salem Red Sox. He returned to Greenville, now the Red Sox's High-A affiliate, to begin the 2021 season. Greenberg batted .326 with seven home runs and 29 RBIs in 27 games before being promoted to the Double-A Portland Sea Dogs.

Granberg began the 2022 season on the injured list with Portland.

Creighton Bluejays bio
Dallas Baptist Patriots bio

Gilberto Jiménez

Gilberto Jiménez (born July 8, 2000) is a Dominican professional baseball outfielder in the Boston Red Sox organization.

Jiménez first played professionally for the Dominican Summer League Red Sox in 2018, posting a .319 batting average with 22 runs batted in (RBIs) in 67 games. He spent 2019 with the Class A Short Season Lowell Spinners, batting .359 with three home runs and 19 RBIs in 59 games. He did not play professionally during 2020, due to cancellation of the minor-league season. He played for the Low-A Salem Red Sox in 2021, batting .306 with three home runs and 56 RBIs in 59 games.

Jiménez began the 2022 season in High-A with the Greenville Drive, ranked 18th within Boston's top 30 prospects by MLB.com.

SoxProspects scouting report

Blaze Jordan

Blaze Jordan (born December 19, 2002) is an American professional baseball third baseman in the Boston Red Sox organization.

Jordan rose to prominence as a child when he went viral after hitting a  home run at Globe Life Park in Arlington at age 11 and a  home run at age 13. In eighth grade, he committed to play college baseball at Mississippi State University. He attended DeSoto Central High School in Southaven, Mississippi. 

In 2019, he hit .440 with ten home runs and 46 RBIs. Following the season, he reclassified from the class of 2021 to the class of 2020. That summer, he won the 2019 High School Home Run Derby at Progressive Field, hitting a total of 27 home runs over three rounds. He also played in the Under Armour All-America Baseball Game and the Perfect Game All-American Classic. In 2020, his senior year, he batted .422 with six doubles, five triples and four RBIs before the season was cancelled due to the COVID-19 pandemic; he was named the Gatorade Mississippi Baseball Player of the Year.

Jordan was selected by the Boston Red Sox in the third round (89th overall) of the 2020 Major League Baseball draft. He signed for $1.75 million. Due to the cancellation of the 2020 minor league season, he spent the summer working out and practicing in his home state of Mississippi. Following that summer, he spent time at Fenway South participating in Boston's instructional league. Jordan began the 2021 season in extended spring training before being assigned to the Rookie-level Florida Complex League Red Sox in late June. In early August, after batting .362 with four home runs and seven doubles over 19 games, he was promoted to the Salem Red Sox of the Low-A East. Over nine games with Salem, Jordan hit .250 with two home runs and seven RBIs.

Jordan returned to Salem to open the 2022 season. In early August, he was promoted to the Greenville Drive of the High-A South Atlantic League. Over 120 games between both teams, he slashed .289/.363/.445 with 12 home runs, 68 RBIs, and thirty doubles.

Niko Kavadas

Nikolos Siade Kavadas (born October 27, 1998) is an American professional baseball first baseman in the Boston Red Sox organization.

Kavadas grew up in Granger, Indiana, and attended Penn High School. As a junior, he was named first team All-Northern Indiana Conference and Class 4-A All-State after batting for a .440 average with three home runs, 14 doubles, and 44 RBIs.

Kavadas played college baseball at Notre Dame for four seasons. After his freshman season, he played in the Northwoods League for the Kalamazoo Growlers, compiling a .308 average. After his sophomore season in 2019, he played for the Harwich Mariners of the Cape Cod Baseball League, where he was named a league all-star and tied for the league lead with nine home runs in 40 games. As a junior, Kavadas hit .255 with seven home runs and 17 RBIs in 13 games before the season was cut short due to the coronavirus pandemic. He batted .302 and hit a school record 22 home runs with 64 RBIs in his senior season and was named first team All-Atlantic Coast Conference and a first team All-American by Baseball America. Kavadas finished his collegiate career with 46 home runs and 146 RBIs while batting for a .286 average over 161 games played.

Kavadas was selected in the 11th round of the 2021 MLB draft by the Red Sox. He signed with the team on August 1, 2021, and received a $250,000 bonus. He was initially assigned to the Florida Complex League Red Sox, then promoted to the Low-A Salem Red Sox in August. Overall with both teams in 2021, Kavadas batted .256 with two home runs and six RBIs in 15 games.

Kavadas began the 2022 season with Salem. In the minor leagues in 2022, he batted .280/.443/.547 in 393 at bats, and was second in the minor leagues with 102 walks. He was named the minor-league Offensive Player of the Year by the Red Sox organization. After the season, he was selected to play in the Arizona Fall League.

Notre Dame Fighting Irish bio

Christian Koss

Christian Koss (born January 27, 1998) is an American professional baseball shortstop in the Boston Red Sox organization.

Koss was born and grew up in Riverside, California and attended John W. North High School.

Koss played college baseball career at UC Irvine for three seasons. Following his freshman and sophomore seasons, he played collegiate summer baseball with the Yarmouth–Dennis Red Sox of the Cape Cod Baseball League and was named a league All-Star in 2018. Koss batted .307 with five home runs and 30 RBIs in 54 games as a junior.

Koss was selected in the 12th of the 2019 Major League Baseball draft by the Colorado Rockies. He was assigned to the Grand Junction Rockies, where he batted .332 with 11 home runs, 11 doubles, four triples and 51 RBIs. Koss was traded to the Boston Red Sox in exchange for minor league pitcher Yoan Aybar on December 4, 2020. Koss spent the 2021 season with the High-A Greenville Drive and batted .271 with 15 home runs.

Koss was named to the Red Sox' 2022 spring training roster as a non-roster invitee. He began the 2022 season in Double-A with the Portland Sea Dogs.

UC Irvine Anteaters bio

Liu Chih-jung

Liu Chih-jung (born April 7, 1999) is a Taiwanese professional baseball pitcher in the Boston Red Sox organization.

Liu played shortstop and pitcher in high school. He participated in the 2017 U-18 Baseball World Cup for Chinese Taipei as a pitcher and position player. Due to a heavy pitching load in high school, Liu's coaches at Chinese Culture University utilized his skills solely as a position player during his first season of collegiate baseball. He returned to the mound in 2019. Liu pitched in the 2019 Asian Baseball Championship, in which he was named the most valuable player, and the Chinese Taipei national baseball team won the gold medal. He was to appear in the 2019 WBSC Premier12, but sat out the tournament due to injuries.

Liu signed with the Boston Red Sox as a pitcher on October 23, 2019, for US$750,000. Liu arrived in the United States for spring training with the Red Sox in February 2020. After the 2020 minor league season was cancelled due to the COVID-19 pandemic, Liu was invited to participate in the Red Sox' fall instructional league. Liu began the 2021 season in extended spring training, was first assigned to the Florida Complex League Red Sox where he made a single start, and was then promoted to the Salem Red Sox in early July. Overall during the 2021 season, he compiled a 4.23 ERA and 5–1 record in 13 starts while striking out 60 batters in  innings pitched.

Liu began the 2022 season in High-A with the Greenville Drive.

Matthew Lugo

Matthew Jabel Lugo (born May 9, 2001) is a Puerto Rican professional baseball shortstop for the Boston Red Sox organization. He is the nephew of former MLB player Carlos Beltrán.

After Lugo's junior year in high school, he was selected to play in the 2018 Perfect Game All-American Classic. He was committed to the University of Miami and was the highest-ranked Puerto Rican prospect (No. 38) in the 2019 MLB draft. In the draft, the Red Sox selected Lugo in the second round. After getting drafted and forgoing a college career, he was assigned to the GCL Red Sox, where he played 39 games and slashed .257/.342/.331 with one home run. In the winter, Lugo played in the Puerto Rican Winter League for Atenienses de Manatí. After the 2020 minor league season was cancelled due to the COVID-19 pandemic, Lugo was invited to participate in the Red Sox' fall instructional league. Lugo spent the 2021 season in Low-A with the Salem Red Sox, batting .270 with four home runs and 50 RBIs in 105 games.

Lugo began the 2022 season in High-A with the Greenville Drive.

Bryan Mata

Bryan Eduardo Mata (born May 3, 1999) is a Venezuelan professional baseball pitcher in the Boston Red Sox organization.

Mata signed with the Boston Red Sox as an international free agent in January 2016 for a $25,000 signing bonus. He made his professional debut that summer for the DSL Red Sox and spent all the whole season there, compiling a 4–4 record, a 2.80 ERA, and a 1.20 WHIP in 14 games started. In 2017, he played for the Class A Greenville Drive where he posted a 5–6 record with a 3.74 ERA in 17 starts.

MLB.com ranked Mata as Boston's fourth best prospect going into the 2018 season. Playing for the Class A-Advanced Salem Red Sox, Mata was the sole Boston prospect selected to the 2018 All-Star Futures Game, where he pitched an inning of scoreless relief, allowing one hit while walking one and striking out one. In 17 starts for Salem, Mata was 6–3 with a 3.50 ERA and a 1.61 WHIP.

Mata started the 2019 season with Salem, and was promoted to the Double-A Portland Sea Dogs on July 1. Overall with both teams during the season, Mata compiled a 7–7 record with 3.43 ERA and 111 strikeouts in 105 innings. After the 2020 minor league season was cancelled due to the COVID-19 pandemic, Mata was invited to participate in the Red Sox' fall instructional league. Following the 2020 season, Mata was ranked by Baseball America as the Red Sox' number four prospect.

On November 20, 2020, Mata was added to the 40-man roster. During 2021 spring training, he sustained a slight UCL tear. On April 13, 2021, Mata underwent Tommy John surgery, ending his 2021 season. Mata began the 2022 season on the injured list in Triple-A with the Worcester Red Sox. He resumed pitching in May in extended spring training, and played in a minor-league game for the first time in over two years in early June.

Mata was assigned to the Triple-A Worcester Red Sox to begin the 2023 season.

Chris Murphy

Christopher Michael Murphy (born June 5, 1998) is an American professional baseball pitcher who plays in the Boston Red Sox organization.

Murphy grew up in Granada Hills, California, and graduated from high school there. He played college baseball for the San Diego Toreros for three seasons. He was named a Freshman All-American by Collegiate Baseball after posting a 3–4 record with a 4.17 ERA and a team-high 89 strikeouts. In 2018, he played collegiate summer baseball with the Brewster Whitecaps of the Cape Cod Baseball League. As a junior, Murphy went 4–3 with a 3.50 ERA and 87 strikeouts with 43 walks over  innings pitched.

Murphy was selected in the sixth round of the 2019 Major League Baseball draft by the Boston Red Sox. After signing with the team, he was assigned to the Low-A Lowell Spinners and posted a 1.08 ERA with 34 strikeouts in  innings pitched. Murphy began the 2021 season with the High-A Greenville Drive before being promoted to the Double-A Portland Sea Dogs. Overall with both teams during 2021, Murphy made 21 appearances (20 starts), compiling a 4.62 ERA and 8–5 record while striking out 128 batters in  innings.

Murphy began the 2022 season with Portland. He made his Triple-A debut with the Worcester Red Sox on June 30. 

On November 15, 2022, Murphy was added to Boston's 40-man roster. Murphy was optioned to Triple-A Worcester to begin the 2023 season.

Note

San Diego Toreros bio

Ceddanne Rafaela

Ceddanne Chipper Nicasio Marte Rafaela (born September 18, 2000) is a Curaçaoan professional baseball outfielder in the Boston Red Sox organization.

Rafaela signed with the Boston Red Sox as an international free agent in July 2017. He made his professional debut in 2018 with the Dominican Summer League Red Sox. In 2019, he played for the Gulf Coast Red Sox and Lowell Spinners.

Rafaela did not play in 2020 due to the Minor League Baseball season being cancelled because of the Covid-19 pandemic. He returned in 2021 to play for the Salem Red Sox. He started 2022 with the Greenville Drive before being promoted to the Portland Sea Dogs. Rafaela was selected to the 2022 All-Star Futures Game. For the season, Rafaela was named minor-league Defensive Player of the Year by the Red Sox organization. 

On November 15, 2022, he was added to Boston's 40-man roster. In January 2023, he was ranked 71st in the Baseball America list of baseball's top 100 prospects. Rafaela was optioned to the Triple-A Worcester Red Sox to begin the 2023 season.

Enmanuel Valdez

Enmanuel Valdez (born December 28, 1998) is a Dominican professional baseball infielder in the Boston Red Sox organization.

Valdez signed with the Houston Astros as an international free agent in July 2015. He made his professional debut in 2016 with the Dominican Summer League Astros. He played 2017 with the Gulf Coast Astros and Greeneville Astros, 2018 with the Tri-City ValleyCats, and 2019 with the Quad Cities River Bandits and Fayetteville Woodpeckers.

Valdez did not play in 2020 due to cancellation of the minor-league season amid the COVID-19 pandemic. He returned in 2021 to play for the Asheville Tourists and Corpus Christi Hooks. He started 2022 with Corpus Christi.

On August 1, 2022, Valdez and Wilyer Abreu were traded to the Boston Red Sox for Christian Vázquez.

On November 10, 2022, the Red Sox added him to their 40 man roster. Valdez was optioned to the Triple-A Worcester Red Sox to begin the 2023 season.

Brandon Walter

Brandon Lee Walter (born September 8, 1996) is an American professional baseball pitcher in the Boston Red Sox organization.

Walter grew up in New Castle, Delaware and attended Hodgson Vo-Tech High School. He finished his high school career with a 23–3 record and a 0.83 earned run average (ERA).

Walter played college baseball at the University of Delaware. He became the Blue Hens' primary weekend starter as a freshman and was named third team All-Colonial Athletic Association after going 7–3 with a 3.63 ERA and 85 strikeouts. Walter tore the ulnar collateral ligament in his pitching elbow in the ninth start of his sophomore season, requiring him to undergo Tommy John surgery and miss the rest of the year and his entire junior season. He returned in 2019 and went 5–6 with a 3.86 ERA while striking out 106 batters over  innings pitched.

Walter was selected in the 26th round of the 2019 MLB draft by the Boston Red Sox. After signing with the team, he was assigned to the Gulf Coast League Red Sox. Walter began the 2021 season with the Low-A Salem Red Sox. He was promoted to the High-A Greenville Drive after posting a 1.45 ERA over 13 appearances. Walter made 25 appearances with 14 starts between the two teams and was named the Red Sox Minor League Pitcher of the Year after having a 2.92 ERA, a 0.97 WHIP, and a .199 batting average against.

Walter began the 2022 season in Double-A with the Portland Sea Dogs. In June, he was promoted to the Triple-A Worcester Red Sox. 

On November 15, 2022, Walter was added to Boston's 40-man roster. Walter was optioned to Triple-A Worcester to begin the 2023 season.

Delaware Blue Hens bio

Full Triple-A to Rookie League rosters
As part of Major League Baseball's restructuring of Minor League Baseball prior to the 2021 season, the Red Sox dropped the Lowell Spinners, a Class A Short Season team, as an affiliate.

Triple-A
The Worcester Red Sox are members of the International League. They have been a Red Sox affiliate since 2021.

Double-A
The Portland Sea Dogs are members of the Eastern League. They have been a Red Sox affiliate since 2003.

High-A
The Greenville Drive are members of South Atlantic League. They have been a Red Sox affiliate since 2005.

Single-A
The Salem Red Sox are members of Carolina League. They have been a Red Sox affiliate since 2009.

Rookie
The Florida Complex League Red Sox are members of the Florida Complex League (FCL). They have been a Red Sox affiliate since 1989; the team was known as the Gulf Coast League Red Sox prior to 2021.

Foreign Rookie
The Dominican Summer League Red Sox are members of the Dominican Summer League (DSL). They have been a Red Sox affiliate since 1997. Since 2015, the Red Sox have usually fielded two teams in the DSL, differentiated as 1 and 2 or Blue and Red.

See also
 List of Boston Red Sox minor league affiliates

References

 

minor league players
Lists of minor league baseball players